Three Times Nothing is a Canadian-French comedy film, directed by Nadège Loiseau and released in 2022. The film centres on Brindille (Antoine Bertrand), Casquette (Philippe Rebbot) and La Flèche (Côme Levin), three homeless men who unexpectedly win the lottery, and struggle to figure out how to claim their winnings without a permanent address.

The film's cast also includes Émilie Caen, Nadège Beausson-Diagne, Yves Yan, Yilin Yang, Atillahan Karagedik, Axelle Simon, Karin Viard and Cédric Martin.

The film premiered in January 2022 at the L'Alpe d'Huez Film Festival, before going into commercial release in March.

References

External links 
 

2022 films
2022 comedy films
Canadian comedy films
French comedy films
French-language Canadian films
Quebec films
Films about homelessness
2020s Canadian films
2020s French films